Paul Gottron was a German cyclist. He competed in the men's sprint event at the 1900 Summer Olympics.

References

External links
 

Year of birth missing
Year of death missing
German male cyclists
Olympic cyclists of Germany
Cyclists at the 1900 Summer Olympics
Place of birth missing